Davit G. Petrosian (born 20 September 1984) is an Armenian chess Grandmaster (2009).

In 2006 he won the B section of the Aeroflot Open. In 2008 he came first in the Autumn-1 Alushta tournament and in the first league of the Armenian Chess Championship. In November 2010, he came third in the Armenian 1st League, which acts as a qualifier to the national Championship. In January 2012 he came fifth in the Andranik Margaryan Memorial.

Notable games
Davit Petrosian vs Mateusz Bartel, European Championship 2010, Four Knights (C47), 1-0
Davit Petrosian vs Artashes Minasian, European Championship 2010, Caro-Kann Defense: Advance Variation (B12), 1-0

References

External links

1984 births
Living people
Chess grandmasters
Armenian chess players